The 2019 ITU World Triathlon Series was the 11th season of the World Triathlon Series, the top level international series for triathlon, since its establishment in 2009. The season consisted of eight pairs of triathlon races for both a men's and woman's competition, beginning on 8 March in Abu Dhabi, and concluding on 1 September with the grand final at Lausanne, Switzerland. The season also contained five mixed relays as part of the Mixed Relay Series which offers national teams qualifying points for the mixed team relay event at the 2020 Tokyo Olympics.

Mario Mola and Vicky Holland began the season as defending champions from the 2018 season. Mario Mola was hoping to defend his title and become the first triathlete to hold the title for four years in a row.

Overview

Calendar 
The 2019 ITU World Triathlon Series visited ten cities, including a test run of the 2020 Olympic relay course as part of the Mixed Relay Series.

Point System 
For every race a triathlete finishes they are awarded points based on their position across the line. For a normal world series event first place is awarded 1000 points and every subsequent place is awarded 7.5% less, for the first forty triathletes, for the grand final 1250 points are awarded once again decreasing by 7.5% for each place but this time awarded down to 50th. However any triathlete outside of the time cut will not be awarded points even if they finish in a scoring position, the time cut is determined by adding 5% to the winner's time in the men's event and 8% in the women's event. A triathletes final score is the sum of their points from the grand final and their best five races of that year.

Series

Abu Dhabi

The 2019 series began with a sprint distance race in Abu Dhabi in and around the marina on Yas Island. It was the 10th time the race had been held there and the 5th time a sprint distance race was held. The swim course was held in the harbour  one 750-metre laps, before heading to transition outside of the Yas Marina Circuit. Athletes then biked five laps of a 4 km course that ran along the Formula 1 circuit. After the bike section, the competitors proceeded to complete two laps of a 2.5 km run circuit over part of the F1 track and part of the marina before finishing the triathlon at the Marina.

The competition field for the race included both defending champions Mario Mola and Vicky Holland, as well as most of the top ten athletes from last year's the overall rankings. Also competing was debutante Alex Yee who had won the most recent World cup race in Cape town.

In the woman race a small split appeared in the swim which was pushed on the bike such that by the halfway point of bike course, a breakaway of seven was fully established. The group included Americans Zaferes, Spivey and Knibb, along with Learmonth of the UK. The breakaway pushed their advantage such that they had a lead a minute on the chasers by the time they hit the second transition. Zaferes was first out onto the run and lead for the rest of the race pulling away from everyone else to win alone. Spivey floated in between first and the battle for third. Meanwhile, Knibb and Learmonth were neck-and-neck for third and finished in a sprint finish which Learmonth won.

On the men's side, whilst a split appeared in the swim and at the start of the bike leg, over the full course of the bike leg the entire field slowly regrouped such that the entire field entered transitioned at the same time. New Zealand's Hayden Wilde initially tried to create a gap on the run, but was soon chased down by the leading pair of Yee and Mola. The pair stayed together and in the lead until with 500m to go Mola upped the pace to claim first with Yee following up in second. Third across the line was Spaniard Fernando Alarza.

Results

Medal summary

Men

Women

Mixed relay

Overall standings
In the individual events, the athlete who accumulates the most points throughout the season is declared the year's world champion. The final point standings are:

References

External links 

 Official website

World Triathlon Series
ITU World Triathlon Series